USS St. Mary's or USS St. Marys has been the name of more than one United States Navy ship, and may refer to:

 , a galley built in 1798 and transferred to the United States Revenue Cutter Service in 1801
 , a sloop-of-war in commission from 1844 to 1873
 St. Mary's (SP-1457), a patrol boat in service from 1917 to 1918
 , an attack transport in commission from 1944 to 1946

See also
 St. Mary's, was a side-wheeled steamer acquired by the U.S. Navy and renamed  in 1861
 CSS St. Mary, a Confederate States Navy ship captured in 1863 by Union forces and commissioned into the U.S. Navy as 
 

United States Navy ship names